Ephraim Lipson, or E. Lipson (1 September 1888, in Sheffield – 22 April 1960) was a British economic historian.

The son of a Jewish furniture dealer, Lipson attended Sheffield Royal Grammar School followed by Trinity College, Cambridge, where he graduated with a First class degree in History.

He taught at Oxford University (as private tutor, independent researcher) Cambridge University (1921–1931), Boston University (1932–1933), University of California (1933–).

Literary works 
 editor of the "Economic History Review" (1921–1934) (with Richard Henry Tawney (1880–1962), Michael Moïssey Postan (1899–1981), H. J. Habbakuk, Economic History Society)
 The economic history of England, 3 Vols., 1915–1931
 Europe in the nineteenth century, 1916
 The history of the English woollen and worsted industries, 1921
 Increased production, 1921
 The inventions, 1934
 Europe, 1914–1939
 A planned economy and free enterprise, 1944

References
 Who was Who
 Encyclopaedia Judaica
 Oxford Dictionary of National Biography

External links
 THE ECONOMIC HISTORY SOCIETY (DOC; English)
  (about publishings; English)
  (publishing catalogue search; English)
  (about publishings; Spanish)

1888 births
1960 deaths
British economists
British Jews
Jewish historians
Economic historians
People educated at King Edward VII School, Sheffield
Alumni of Trinity College, Cambridge
20th-century British historians